Pudgy Picks a Fight is a 1937 Fleischer Studios animated short film starring Betty Boop and Pudgy the Puppy.

Synopsis
Betty Boop is so delighted with her new fox fur. Pudgy the Puppy, thinking the fox is a live animal, jealously handles it, and, when it does not move in response, thinks he killed the creature. Pudgy is then plagued by nightmarish illusions accusing him of guilt (including seeing the shadow of a part of a lamp which he thinks is a noose) and when Betty returns and tells Pudgy that the fox is not alive, he furiously tears the fur to smithereens.

References

External links
 Pudgy Picks a Fight at Big Cartoon Database.
 Pudgy Picks a Fight on YouTube.
 Pudgy Picks a Fight at IMDb.

1937 films
Betty Boop cartoons
1930s American animated films
American black-and-white films
1937 animated films
Paramount Pictures short films
Fleischer Studios short films
Short films directed by Dave Fleischer